Nicolas Todt (born 17 November 1977 in Le Chesnay, Yvelines) is a French motorsport team owner. He is the son of former Ferrari Formula One team principal and former FIA president Jean Todt.

Todt is the manager of major racing drivers, including Daniil Kvyat, Felipe Massa, Pastor Maldonado, James Calado, Charles Leclerc, José María López, Caio Collet, Marcus Armstrong, Gabriele Minì, James Wharton, Martinius Stenshorne and Christian Ho. In 2003, Todt founded All Roads Management to scout, manage and develop talents able to reach the top in motorsport from karting to F1, through the different single-seater formulas, GT, Endurance as well as new categories such as Formula E. Until the end of 2018, he was the co-owner of the motorsport team ART Grand Prix. 

Todt is seen as being very influential in Massa's move from Sauber to Ferrari. There were rumours in mid-2007 that Todt could take over Scuderia Toro Rosso Formula One team, which Toro Rosso team owner Gerhard Berger dismissed.

He holds a Master's degree in management from Toulouse Business School.

References

External links
All Road Management official website

1977 births
Living people
People from Le Chesnay
French motorsport people
Formula One people
Sports car racing team owners
Motorsport team owners
French sports agents
Motorsport agents
Toulouse Business School alumni
Sportspeople from Yvelines